is a Japanese manga series written and illustrated by Sakae Esuno. It was serialized in Kadokawa Shoten's Shōnen Ace magazine between the November 2011 and September 2016 issues. The manga is licensed in North America by Yen Press. An original video animation episode by Asread was released on October 3, 2015. A 10-episode anime television series adaptation aired in Japan between April and June 2016.

Plot
Order users have the ability to grant their wishes with their special powers called Orders. Eiji Hoshimiya believes he is responsible for the Great Destruction that happened exactly ten years ago because of his wish, which is why he refuses to use his power. When the transfer student Rin Kurenai makes a move against him and kidnaps his sister, Eiji's life as an Order user begins and he finds out the truth.

Characters

Main characters

At first, he believes that when he was a kid, what he wished for when he was approached by Daisy was the destruction of the world, but, after being targeted to be assassinated by Rin, he remembers that what he wished for was world domination. Due to his wish, he gains the ability to control anything, living and non-living, as long as they are in his domain, that is, places he has placed his 'anchor' and 'wire' on. He places Rin under his control after he and his sister were about to be killed by her and orders her to be his companion. He also becomes the leader of the infamous organization, "Dazaifu Government Organization" that seeks to create an independent country by declaring war on other countries. Eiji decides to rule this organization to create a world where his sister, Sena would be safe. He falls in love with Rin at first sight and spares her life when she tries to assassinate him.
At first, he thought his wish was to destroy the world, then to rule it (due to his inspiration of a favorite supervillain), but these ideas were all wrong as his memories were tampered with and nor was Bind Dominator his power. His true power is "Illegal Digger", which allows him to steal the power and memories from another. His wish was "to take Sena's fault".

A transfer student in Eiji's class. Rin is targeting Eiji due to the Great Destruction 10 years ago that killed her parents in a fire. Her Order is healing ability - she can heal herself as well as other people and things. She slowly develops feelings for him, and they progress further after learning the truth. Once a temporary member of the UN Dept of Public Safety due to Gennai's control over her but more loyal to Sena. Now she works with Eiji, determined to kill Sena for causing the First Great Destruction.

Eiji's younger stepsister. She is hospitalized due to an undefined illness. Revealed to be the one who caused the Great Destruction by her wish: Me, Mama, Papa, and Eiji to be together forever. Bind Dominator was originally hers, but Eiji's ability, Illegal Digger, stole both her powers and memories of the incident. Was used as the key to open the Gate, but after it failed, she was believed to be dead. However, she's revealed to be alive and creating more Orders instead of Daisy.

Dazaifu's Group of Ten
The members are ordered from First Hand to Tenth Hand. The goal was using Eiji as a puppet leader to make Japan an independent state again by declaring wars. However, their true goal was preventing Gennai from evoking another Great Destruction. After preventing the Second Great Destruction, they decided to slowly disband.

The First Hand. His ability is to stop any act of combat/war, including stopping grenades from exploding.

The Second Hand. A honorable ninja warrior. His ability, "Battle-On: Aramitama" is to pulverize anything at an atomic level, including nuclear missiles.

The Third Hand. A Lt. Colonel who is the acting leader of the Group of Ten and has a bird creature on his shoulder. Appears to be deceitful and calculating with his own agenda, especially with Eiji. His wish was "to deny the world", which resulted in his ability: "Fact to Fiction": the ability to call the truth bull - in other words, a reality warping ability with limited range that undoes events by calling them fiction and bestow events by calling them facts. Currently missing after the failed Second Destruction.

The Fourth Hand. A girl whose Order is seeing the future. She is also the one who 'found' Eiji. Anyone who touches her ribbon, that acts like rabbit ears/antennas, will cause her to rapidly become pregnant and soon give birth, which will result in the loss of her powers, although the baby will disappear after a while if not given birth to. She eventually has romantic feelings for Eiji and becomes a love rival with Rin. Her ability is "Star Seeker": the power of Divination. She once combined her ability with Eiji's ability. Originally known as "Subject #23" of the Hoshimiya Agency.

The Fifth Hand. A tall member who is considered the trump card of the Group of Ten. His ability is called "Apoptosis Bomb", which allows him to offer his life to destroy a target with absolute certainty (it can only be used once). His wish was to "save everyone and everything." He used his ability to prevent the Second Destruction when the gate opened - limiting it to just the destruction of Nara.

The Sixth Hand. A young man whose ability is called "Skyfish Free", which gives him the ability of flight, also possibly extended to other people and may possess super strength, as he helped stop the rock god's fist with Benkei. His wish was "flying in the sky".

The Seventh Hand.

The Eighth Hand. A small young girl. Her Order involves possessing people through their dreams. As long as a person is sleeping she can find them and control their body.

The Ninth Hand. The most mature female and an acting coordinator. Her ability is "Curve Ray", the ability to manipulate light - can also be used to create lasers, optical camouflage, view distant objects, etc. Her wish was to "see the light", due to her poor eyesight.

The Tenth Hand. Apparently appears to be a psycho who was "subject #1" of the Hoshimiya Agency. Views Eiji as a god as the first Great Destruction granted him his freedom. His ability appears to be a dimensional warp gate that involves zippers. He is currently missing after the Second Great Destruction.

Others
Daisy

The one who grants wishes and Orders to people. She decides to stick with Eiji due to her fascination with his power. Later revealed to be a program that can interact with people's desires and make them come true, also acting as a communication system for long-distance orders. States that Gennai is her "father" as he created her..

 Eiji's father and Sena's stepfather, who was thought to be dead during the Great Destruction, but it is revealed by both Daisy and Hiiragi that he is alive and the one who created Daisy. Originally the Director of the Hoshimiya Agency, whose goal was to convert human thoughts into energy, and now acting Vice-Director of the UN Dept of Public Safety. His goal was to sacrifice Sena to open a Gate that will unlock a new world that can make everyone's wish come true - but doing so will create another Great Destruction. His ability is called "Mind Set", which allows him to control people within his 2 meter territory, but still have control over them when they leave his territory (proof of this is that the people have a star-like pupil in their right eye, just like Daisy's). His wish was for the "bliss and harmony of everyone". He was shot protecting Sena from Hiiragi, and said that he was a fool but wanted to see his experiment unfold.

Is a woman who once was an adversary of Eiji and his group, she fights with a hammer and has control over a rock golem. Her Order allows her to petrify her enemies. After she is defeated, she joins up with them. She creates a strong bond with Rin, due to the fact that they both hate Eiji.

A subordinate under the Group of Ten. His ability is "Time Stop": the ability to stop time on a maximum of three targets, such as Sena to stop the progress of her disease. Later during the UN's secret police invasion, it is revealed he is under Gennai's control and takes Sena.

Media

Manga
Big Order is written and illustrated by Sakae Esuno. It was serialized in Kadokawa Shoten's Shōnen Ace magazine between the November 2011 and September 2016 issues. Kadokawa Shoten published 10 tankōbon volumes released between December 21, 2011, and September 26, 2016. North American publisher Yen Press announced their license to the series at Anime Expo 2016.

Anime
An original video animation (OVA) episode, produced by Asread and directed by Nobuharu Kamanaka, was released on October 3, 2015, with the limited edition of the eighth manga volume. The same staff that produced the OVA returned to produce a 10-episode anime television series adaptation, which aired in Japan between April 16 and June 18, 2016. Crunchyroll planned to release the series on Blu-ray and DVD with an English dub by Funimation, however both releases ended up being cancelled and Funimation only offered a sub-only version through electronic sell-through in 2018. Discotek Media released the series sub-only on Blu-ray on November 24, 2020. The OVA was also released alongside it.

Reception
David West of Neo gave the anime a 1 out of 5 stars, criticizing the story, production values, and the main character Eiji as well as his relationship with Sena, which he found to be troubling. He also criticized the plot, noticing that most of the violence was without consequence.

References

External links
  at Monthly Shōnen Ace 
  at Kadokawa Shoten 
  
 

Anime series based on manga
Asread
Crunchyroll anime
Discotek Media
Kadokawa Shoten manga
Manga adapted into television series
Shōnen manga
Supernatural anime and manga
Yen Press titles